Summer Trip to the Sea is a 1978 Soviet drama film directed by Semyon Aranovich.

Plot 
The film tells about students who went to the islands of Novaya Zemlya in 1942 to equip food bases for sailors and how Germans appear on the island.

Cast 
 Igor Fokin		
 Anatoliy Gorin
 Aleksandr Kurennoy
 Viktor Proskurin
 Nikolai Skorobogatov
 Andrey Zotov

References

External links 
 

1978 films
1970s Russian-language films
Soviet drama films
1978 drama films